Alan Ljubić (born 17 December 1985) is a Croatian darts player currently playing in Professional Darts Corporation (PDC) events.

Career
Ljubić qualified for the 2018 PDC World Darts Championship by winning the Eastern European qualifier against Poland's Krzysztof Kciuk 6–2. He played Brendan Dolan of Northern Ireland in the preliminary round, and lost 2–0 in sets.

World Championship results

PDC
 2018: Preliminary round (lost to Brendan Dolan 0–2)

Performance timeline
PDC

References

External links

1985 births
Professional Darts Corporation associate players
Croatian darts players
Living people
Sportspeople from Zagreb